COM One group (Listed in the Paris and Stuttgart stock exchanges from 1992 to 2005) was a manufacturer best known for its computer network adapters.  The company was co-founded in 1987 by Jacques Saubade and Michel Petit and was headquartered in France. The name comes from the company's focus on modems (serial COM port was named COM1).

History

1987 The company started building analog PSTN modems.
1990 company produces PCMCIA modems.
Mid 1990: the company focus on making multi function PC Card communication adapters (PSTN+GSM (data over GSM), then 3in1 PSTN+GSM+ISDN, then 4in1 PSTN+GSM+ISDN+Ethernet).

2000 group activities :
 Mobile computing (high-speed data transmission devices for wire & wireless : PSTN, ISDN, LAN (Ethernet), GSM, GPRS, ADSL).
 Industrial modules (same as below)
 Video Security
 Internet appliances hardware (non-PC internet terminals. Brand: atMax, @max)

Most of the mobile products were sold as OEM provider for other companies (Toshiba France and Spain, Sony ITE Europe, IBM, Apple Europe, RFI Germany, Anycom, ...)

2001: some employees of the industrial modules department leave to create Telecom Design
2003: Video security department sold to the company Atral
2005: COM One group closed. The brand was bought by Baracoda company to focus it on Bluetooth end user products.
2007: Com One launched hardware to listen internet radios over Wi-Fi.
2008: the web sites (www.com1.fr and com-one.biz) are closed and the brand seems off.

Products, brands
 Bluetooths adapters (USB, PCMCIA).
 Bluetooths gateways (PSTN modems, ISDN).
 Internet appliances hardware (non-PC internet terminals). Brands : @max, Neomax.
 ISDNs adapters (Serial, USB, PCMCIA).
 Local area network interface cards (PCMCIA).
 Modems PSTN (Serial, USB, PCMCIA).
 Video security : Viewcom products range, remote video surveillance products with digital video recorder. Used for example by the web site Viewsurf.com in the 2000s (decade).
 Wireless access points, adapters, and connectivity products
 internet radio hardware (ove Wi-Fi) : the COM One Phoenix and the Orange Liveradio.

References

External links
 2002 COM One's archived web site.
 2005 Mirror web site.
 2006 Official homepage. French only.
 Phoenix Wi-Fi radio's configuration portal..
 Orange liveradio's website..
 Phoenix Wi-Fi radio unofficial support.

Computer hardware companies
Computer companies of France
Telecommunications equipment vendors
Defunct technology companies of France
Electronics companies established in 1987
French companies established in 1987
French brands
2005 mergers and acquisitions